American hip hop recording artist and record producer Kanye West has embarked on six concert tours and performed live at various award ceremonies and television shows.

Concert tours

Concert residencies

Promotional concerts

Performances at festivals

Award show performances

Performances on television shows

Performances on specials

Other performances

References

External links
 Tours of Kanye West at Live Nation

West, Kanye